"Sekai wa Doko Made Aozora na no ka?" (世界はどこまで青空なのか？, "Where does the blue sky of the world end?") is the second single by Japanese idol girl group NGT48. It will be released on December 6, 2017.

Release and promotion 
The CD will be released in multiple different editions: three limited editions (Type A, Type B, Type C) and four regular editions (Type A, Type B, Type and "Regular Edition").

The center for this single is Yuka Ogino, who has previously ranked fifth in AKB48's General Election (Senbatsu Sousenkyou).

Track listing

Type A

Type B

Type C

Regular Edition

Senbatsu 
 Team NIII: Yuka Ogino, Tsugumu Oguma, Yuki Kashiwagi, Minami Kato, Rie Kitahara, Anju Sato, Riko Sugahara, Moeka Takakura, Ayaka Tano, Rika Nakai, Marina Nishigata, Rea Hasegawa, Hinata Homma, Fuka Murakumo, Maho Yamaguchi, Noe Yamada
 NGT48 Kenkyuusei: Yuria Kado, Miyajima Aya

References 

NGT48 songs
2017 singles
2017 songs